The arrondissement of Sélestat-Erstein is an arrondissement of France in the Bas-Rhin department in the Grand Est region. It has 101 communes.

Composition

The communes of the arrondissement of Sélestat-Erstein, and their INSEE codes, are:

 Albé (67003)
 Andlau (67010)
 Artolsheim (67011)
 Baldenheim (67019)
 Barr (67021)
 Bassemberg (67022)
 Benfeld (67028)
 Bernardswiller (67031)
 Bernardvillé (67032)
 Bindernheim (67040)
 Blienschwiller (67051)
 Bœsenbiesen (67053)
 Bolsenheim (67054)
 Boofzheim (67055)
 Bootzheim (67056)
 Bourgheim (67060)
 Breitenau (67062)
 Breitenbach (67063)
 Châtenois (67073)
 Dambach-la-Ville (67084)
 Daubensand (67086)
 Diebolsheim (67090)
 Dieffenbach-au-Val (67092)
 Dieffenthal (67094)
 Ebersheim (67115)
 Ebersmunster (67116)
 Eichhoffen (67120)
 Elsenheim (67121)
 Epfig (67125)
 Erstein (67130)
 Fouchy (67143)
 Friesenheim (67146)
 Gerstheim (67154)
 Gertwiller (67155)
 Goxwiller (67164)
 Heidolsheim (67187)
 Heiligenstein (67189)
 Herbsheim (67192)
 Hessenheim (67195)
 Hilsenheim (67196)
 Hindisheim (67197)
 Hipsheim (67200)
 Le Hohwald (67210)
 Huttenheim (67216)
 Ichtratzheim (67217)
 Innenheim (67223)
 Itterswiller (67227)
 Kertzfeld (67233)
 Kintzheim (67239)
 Kogenheim (67246)
 Krautergersheim (67248)
 Lalaye (67255)
 Limersheim (67266)
 Mackenheim (67277)
 Maisonsgoutte (67280)
 Marckolsheim (67281)
 Matzenheim (67285)
 Meistratzheim (67286)
 Mittelbergheim (67295)
 Mussig (67310)
 Muttersholtz (67311)
 Neubois (67317)
 Neuve-Église (67320)
 Niedernai (67329)
 Nordhouse (67336)
 Nothalten (67337)
 Obenheim (67338)
 Obernai (67348)
 Ohnenheim (67360)
 Orschwiller (67362)
 Osthouse (67364)
 Reichsfeld (67387)
 Rhinau (67397)
 Richtolsheim (67398)
 Rossfeld (67412)
 Saasenheim (67422)
 Saint-Martin (67426)
 Saint-Maurice (67427)
 Saint-Pierre (67429)
 Saint-Pierre-Bois (67430)
 Sand (67433)
 Schaeffersheim (67438)
 Scherwiller (67445)
 Schœnau (67453)
 Schwobsheim (67461)
 Sélestat (67462)
 Sermersheim (67464)
 Steige (67477)
 Stotzheim (67481)
 Sundhouse (67486)
 Thanvillé (67490)
 Triembach-au-Val (67493)
 Urbeis (67499)
 Uttenheim (67501)
 Valff (67504)
 La Vancelle (67505)
 Villé (67507)
 Westhouse (67526)
 Witternheim (67545)
 Wittisheim (67547)
 Zellwiller (67557)

History

The arrondissement of Sélestat-Erstein was created in 1974 by the merger of the former arrondissements of Erstein and Sélestat.

As a result of the reorganisation of the cantons of France which came into effect in 2015, the borders of the cantons are no longer related to the borders of the arrondissements. The cantons of the arrondissement of Sélestat-Erstein were, as of January 2015:

 Barr
 Benfeld
 Erstein
 Marckolsheim
 Obernai
 Sélestat
 Villé

References

Sélestat
Selestat-Erstein